Traders Point Christian Church (TPCC) is a multi-site, nondenominational church with campuses in the Indianapolis, Indiana greater metropolitan area. Traders Point has been cited as one of Outreach Magazine’s “100 Fastest Growing Churches in America” for 2016 and has been led by Aaron Brockett since 2007.

History
Traders Point Christian Church began in 1834. In 2016, Traders Point became a multisite church after opening a second location in Carmel, Indiana. There are now six total locations, one each in Plainfield, Broad Ripple, Downtown Indianapolis, Fishers, Carmel and  Whitestown.

Traders Point Christian Church streams services live every Sunday from the Whitestown campus. Each location has its own worship experience, video teaching, and campus pastor.

References 

Buildings and structures in Boone County, Indiana
Churches in Indianapolis
1834 establishments in Indiana